Michael Epkenhans (b. 1955 at Wiedenbrück, Germany) is a German military historian known for his works dealing with the German Imperial Navy. He was the director of the Otto-von-Bismarck-Stiftung in Friedrichsruh from 1996 to 2009. In February 2009 he became the director of research for the Militärgeschichtliches Forschungsamt der Bundeswehr in Potsdam. Following a reorganisation in 2013, the organisation became the Center for Military History and Social Sciences of the Bundeswehr.

Publications 
 Co-Editor with Jörg Hillmann and Frank Nägler: Skagerrakschlacht. Vorgeschichte - Ereignis - Verarbeitung, Beiträge zur Militärgeschichte, Band 66; Militärgeschichtliches Forschungsamt, Potsdam; R. OLdenbourg Verlag, München, 2., überarbeitete Auflage 2010  
 Tirpitz: Architect of the German High Seas Fleet, Potomac Books, Washington, DC 2008 
 Die wilhelminische Flottenrüstung 1908 - 1914: Weltmachtstreben, industrieller Fortschritt, soziale Integration, R. Oldenbourg Verlag, Munich 1991

References

Living people
German military historians
German naval historians
1955 births
German male non-fiction writers
Military History Research Office (Germany) personnel